Nikita Valentinovich Valenza (born 21 April 1997) is a Russian football player.

He made his debut in the Russian Football National League for FC Baikal Irkutsk on 27 March 2016 in a game against FC SKA-Energiya Khabarovsk.

References

External links
 Profile by Russian Football National League

1997 births
People from Angarsk
Living people
Russian footballers
Association football defenders
FC Baikal Irkutsk players
Sportspeople from Irkutsk Oblast